Eldo T. Ridgway (December 17, 1880 – October 12, 1955) was an American physician and politician.

Born in Knox, Indiana, Ridgway received his medical degree from Hahnemann Medical College and Hospital in Chicago, Illinois in 1906. He started his medical practice in Wautoma, Wisconsin and then moved to Elkhorn, Wisconsin in 1912. Ridgway served in the Wisconsin State Senate from 1921 to 1925 and was a Republican. From 1928 to 1934, Ridgway served as mayor of Elkhorn. He also served on the board of education and the Elkhorn City Power and Light Commission. Ridgway moved to California in 1944, but later returned and reopen his medical practice. He died in Lebanon, Illinois.

Notes

1880 births
1955 deaths
People from Knox, Indiana
People from Elkhorn, Wisconsin
Drexel University alumni
Physicians from Wisconsin
Mayors of places in Wisconsin
School board members in Wisconsin
Republican Party Wisconsin state senators
20th-century American politicians
People from Waushara County, Wisconsin
People from Lebanon, Illinois